The 1975 season was the Hawthorn Football Club's 51st season in the Victorian Football League and 74th overall. Hawthorn finished as minor premiers for the fourth time and the first time since 1971, This was the first time Hawthorn qualified for finals in consecutive seasons. Hawthorn qualified for their fourth Grand Final and their first since 1971. This was their first Grand Final defeat since 1963.

Fixture

Premiership season

Finals Series

Ladder

References

Hawthorn Football Club seasons